Sowmaeh-ye Bala or Sowmeeh Bala may refer to:
 Sowmaeh-ye Bala, East Azerbaijan
 Sowmaeh-ye Bala, Razavi Khorasan